Shumerlinsky District  (Śĕmĕrle rayonĕ) is an administrative and municipal district (raion), one of the twenty-one in the Chuvash Republic, Russia. It is located in the west of the republic and borders with Alikovsky and Krasnochetaysky Districts in the north, Vurnarsky District in the east, Ibresinsky and Poretsky Districts in the south, and with Nizhny Novgorod Oblast on the Sura River in the west. Its administrative center is the town of Shumerlya (which is not administratively a part of the district). Population:  13,298 (2002 Census);

History
The district was formed on January 9, 1935.

Administrative and municipal status
Within the framework of administrative divisions, Shumerlinsky District is one of the twenty-one in the republic. The town of Shumerlya serves as its administrative center, despite being incorporated separately as a town of republic significance—an administrative unit with the status equal to that of the districts.

As a municipal division, the district is incorporated as Shumerlinsky Municipal District. The town of republic significance of Shumerlya is incorporated separately from the district as Shumerlya Urban Okrug.

Notable residents 

Valery Yardy (1948–1994), Olympic road cyclist

References

Notes

Sources

Districts of Chuvashia